The 1974–75 Challenge Cup was the 74th staging of rugby league's oldest knockout competition, the Challenge Cup.
The final was contested by Widnes and Warrington at Wembley.

Widnes beat Warrington 14–7 at Wembley in front of a crowd of 85,098.

The winner of the Lance Todd Trophy was Widnes , Ray Dutton.

This was Widnes’ fourth Cup final win in sixth Final appearances.

First round

Second round

Quarter-finals

Semi-finals

Final

References

External links
Challenge Cup official website 
Challenge Cup 1974/75 results at Rugby League Project

Challenge Cup
Challenge Cup